Heiki Valk  (born 7 May 1959, in Tartu) is an Estonian archaeologist. He is a senior research fellow and head of archaeological laboratory at Tartu University specialising in Estonia in the Middle Ages. From 23 January 2008, he has been Chairman of the Estonian Learned Society and was its secretary from 1993 to 1996.

He graduated from the University of Tartu of History in 1983. He has produced a thesis entitled "Rural cemeteries of Southern Estonia 1225-1800 AD" (2001). He has also served as Scientific Secretary of the Archaeology of Tartu from 1992 to 1999.

He is a recipient of the President's Award in the field of folklore.  (1994)

Works
Kodu Lugu. 1. ja 2. osa. Koos Mart Laari ja Lauri Vahtrega.
Lõuna-Eesti talurahva matmiskombestik ja selle uskumuslikud tagamaad 13.-17/18. sajandil. Magistritöö. Tartu, 1992.
Rural cemeteries of Southern Estonia 1225-1800 AD. Doktoritöö. Visby: Gotland University College, Centre for Baltic Studies, 2001.
Siksälä : a community at the frontiers : Iron Age and Medieval. Koos Silvia Lauluga. Tallinn, Tartu, 2007.
 Strongholds and Power Centres East of the Baltic Sea in the 11th-13th centuries. [Compiled and edited by Heiki Valk]. Muinasaja Teadus 24. Tartu, 2014

References
www.arheo.ut.ee

Estonian archaeologists
1959 births
Living people
People from Tartu
Historians of Estonia
Recipients of the Order of the White Star, 5th Class